Trechus murzorum is a species of ground beetle in the subfamily Trechinae. It was described by Belousov & Kabak in 1994.

References

murzorum
Beetles described in 1994